Barzun is a commune in the Pyrénées-Atlantiques department in the Nouvelle-Aquitaine region of south-western France.

The inhabitants of the commune are known as Barzunais or Barzunaises.

Geography
Barzun is located some 20 km east by south-east of Pau and 15 km north-west of Lourdes. Access to the commune is by the D940 road from Espoey in the north-west which passes through the commune just west of the village and continues south to Lamarque-Pontacq. The D640 comes from Livron in the north and passes through the village continuing to Pontacq in the south. The D642 and the D418 connect the D940 to the village. The D42 passes through the eastern tip of the commune. The commune is all farmland except for a belt of forest east of and parallel to the Ruisseau de l'Ousse.

The Ruisseau de l'Ousse flows through the commune and the village from south-east to north and continues north to join the Gave de Pau at Pau. The Oussère river flows parallel to the Ruisseau de l'Ousse west of the village until they join north of the commune. The Sausse forms the western border of the commune as it flows north to join the Ourrou north-west of the commune. The Hoursoumou and the Ruisseau du Goua de Michou flow parallel to each other north through the east of the commune continuing to join the Gabas Lake at Luquet.

Places and hamlets

 Arribarrouy
 Balagué
 Batailles 
 Bédat
 Bédat et Sarrailh
 Boyrie
 Capblan
 Cazaillet
 Cazala (barn)
 Las Cordes
 La Débèze
 Goua (bridge)
 Grada (barn)
 Hourcaspy
 Hourmiau
 Hourq Mayou et Espélague
 Labourdette
 Lanas
 Lapalangue (bridge)
 Larbiouze (barn)
 Larroutis
 Layrisse (barn)
 Lupié Thén
 Moulat
 Nargasse (barn)
 Pardimène (mill)
 Pène
 Pistoulet (barn)
 Le Poublan
 Ramounet
 Técous et Labie
 Tisnères (barn)

Toponymy

Michel Grosclaude said that the name probably comes from the Latin anthroponym Barisius with the suffix -unum.

The following table details the origins of the commune name and other names in the commune.

Sources:
Raymond: Topographic Dictionary of the Department of Basses-Pyrenees, 1863, on the page numbers indicated in the table. 
Grosclaude: Toponymic Dictionary of communes, Béarn, 2006 
Cassini1: 1750 Cassini Map
Cassini2: 1790 Cassini Map

Origins:
Chapter: Titles of the Chapter of Béarn
Census: Census of Béarn
Reformation: Reformation of Béarn

History
Paul Raymond noted of page 22 of his 1863 dictionary that Barzun had 13 fires in 1385 and depended on the bailiwick of Pau.

In the 18th century Barzun was the chief town for the notary of Rivière-Ousse which comprised Artigueloutan, Barzun, Espoey, Gomer, Hours, Lée, Livron, Louboey, Lucgarier, Nousty, Ousse, Sendets, and Soumoulou.

Administration

List of Successive Mayors

Inter-communality

The commune is part of four inter-communal structures:
 the Communauté de communes du Nord-Est Béarn;
 the water management association of the Ousse basin
 the Energy association of Pyrénées-Atlantiques;
 the inter-communal association for water and sanitation in the Ousse valley;

Education
The commune has a public primary school.

Demography
In 2017 the commune had 591 inhabitants.

Economy
The commune is part of the Appellation d'origine contrôlée of Ossau-iraty

Culture and heritage

Religious heritage
The Parish Church of Saint Vincent Diacre (1854) is registered as an historical monument.

Notable people linked to the commune
 Louis Pardimène, born on 15 July 1880 in Barzun, son of Pierre and Marie Ribes, soldier in the 83rd Infantry Regiment who was shot as an example on 7 January 1915 at Châlons-sur-Marne.
 Pierre-Marie Théas, born in 1894 at Barzun and died in 1977, was a French Catholic religious, Bishop of Montauban then of the Diocese of Tarbes-et-Lourdes.
 Gaëtan Paletou, Racing driver who participated in the 24 Hours of Le Mans in 2015.

See also
Communes of the Pyrénées-Atlantiques department

References

Communes of Pyrénées-Atlantiques